The European Swimming Masters Championships (or "LEN Swimming Masters Championships") is an international Aquatics championships for adults (per FINA rules, Masters are 25 years old and older). The championships are held biennially (in odd years until 2013, then even years from 2016), with competition in all five of FINA's disciplines: Swimming, Diving, Water Polo, Open Water Swimming, and Synchronized Swimming. Starting in 2016, the competition will be held jointly with the European Aquatics Championships (except 2018).

Editions
Results:

 2013 Waterpolo in Hungary.
 2021 (2020) European Masters Championships was cancelled due to the coronavirus pandemic.
 The championships are held biennially (in odd years until 2013, then even years from 2016), with competition in all five of FINA's disciplines: Swimming, Diving, Water Polo, Open Water Swimming, and Synchronized Swimming. Starting in 2016, the competition will be held jointly with the European Aquatics Championships (except 2018).

See also
 European Swimming Championships
 World Masters Swimming Championships

Results
 http://www2.len.eu/?page_id=4184&s=MA - Results
 LEN European Masters Championships 2016
 https://web.archive.org/web/20190413183139/http://www2.len.eu/?page_id=4184&s=MA - Past Results
 https://web.archive.org/web/20110822181839/http://www.len.eu/index_2011.php?pag=competitions
 http://swim.by/european-masters-swimming-championship-2016/ - 2016 Report
 http://swim.by/european-masters-swimming-championships-2018/ - 2018 Medal Table
 http://len.eu/wp-content/uploads/2016/05/Yalta_211res_all_sw.pdf 
 http://www2.len.eu/wp-content/uploads/2019/05/MASTER_EINDHOVEN_2013_full.pdf
 https://www.fina-fukuoka2022.org/en/masters/

External links
 LEN European Masters Championships 2016
 LEN European Masters Championships 2020
 http://www.swimmasters.eu/calendar

References

International swimming competitions
European championships
Recurring sporting events established in 1987
Senior sports competitions